Janaesia is a genus of moths of the family Noctuidae.

Selected species
Janaesia antarctica (Staudinger, 1899)
Janaesia carnea (Druce, 1903)
Janaesia exclusiva Angulo & Olivares, 1999
Janaesia hibernans (Köhler, 1968)

References
Natural History Museum Lepidoptera genus database

Noctuinae